Charles George Bingham, 4th Earl of Lucan, KP (8 May 1830 – 5 June 1914), styled Lord Bingham from 1839 to 1888, was an Irish peer and soldier.

He was the eldest son of George Bingham, 3rd Earl of Lucan and Lady Anne Brudenell. His maternal grandparents were Robert Brudenell, 6th Earl of Cardigan and Penelope Anne Cooke. He was educated at Rugby School and entered the Army.

He became Lieutenant-Colonel of the Coldstream Guards and served as aide-de-camp to his father, who commanded the cavalry division during the Crimea War. He succeeded his father to the earldom in 1888.

He was elected a Member of Parliament for Mayo from 1865 to 1874. He was appointed Vice-Admiral of Connaught in 1889, and Lord Lieutenant and Custos Rotulorum for County Mayo in 1901. He was created a Knight of St. Patrick in 1898.

He married Lady Cecilia Catherine Gordon-Lennox. She was the youngest daughter of Charles Gordon-Lennox, 5th Duke of Richmond and Lady Caroline Paget. Caroline was the eldest daughter of Henry Paget, 1st Marquess of Anglesey and his first wife Lady Caroline Elizabeth Villiers. The elder Caroline was a daughter of George Villiers, 4th Earl of Jersey and Frances Villiers, Countess of Jersey. They had seven children:

George Bingham, 5th Earl of Lucan (13 December 1860 – 20 April 1949).
Sir Cecil Edward Bingham (7 December 1861 – 31 May 1934). A major general of the British Army.
Sir Francis Richard Bingham (5 July 1863 – 5 November 1935). A major general of the British Army.
Alexander Frederick Bingham (3 August 1864 – 26 May 1909).
Albert Edward Bingham (30 June 1866 – 6 November 1941).
Lady Rosalind Cecilia Caroline Bingham (26 February 1869 – 18 January 1958). Married James Hamilton, 3rd Duke of Abercorn; they are ancestors of Diana, Princess of Wales.
Capt. Lionel Ernest Bingham (4 November 1876 – 26 July 1927).

He was succeeded in the title by his eldest son George Charles Bingham, 5th Earl of Lucan .

Ancestry

The Complete Peerage

References

External links

1830 births
1914 deaths
Knights of St Patrick
Lord-Lieutenants of Mayo
Politicians from County Mayo
Bingham, Charles Bingham, Lord
Bingham, Charles Bingham, Lord
Bingham, Charles Bingham, Lord
UK MPs who inherited peerages
Irish representative peers
George
Members of Middlesex County Council
Bingham Baronets, of Castlebar